{{Speciesbox
|status = LC
|status_system = IUCN3.1
|status_ref = 
|image = Yucca baileyi subsp. intermedia fh 1179.25 NM B.jpg
|taxon = Yucca intermedia
|authority = McKelvey
|synonyms = * Yucca baileyi var. intermedia (McKelvey) Reveal
 Yucca baileyi subsp. intermedia (McKelvey) HochstätterYucca intermedia var. ramosa McKelvey
|synonyms_ref = Flora of North America, vol 26 Page 437
}}Yucca intermedia'' McKelvey is a species in the family Asparagaceae, with the common name intermediate Yucca. It is a relatively small plant forming clumps of rosettes.

References

intermedia
Plants described in 1947
Flora of New Mexico